Major General George Francis Close, Jr. is a retired senior US Army officer, currently acting as a senior corporate and government executive. He has been recognized for leading and developing organizations in the US, Middle East, and in major strategic military commands.

Education 

In 1998, Close was awarded the Outstanding Alumni award from Dedham High School.

Military career 
Close began his military career in 1974 as an infantry battalion commander (lieutenant colonel) of the 25th Infantry Division in Hawaii. He was later transferred to Washington, D.C., to be a senior aide-de-camp to the Secretary of the Army.

In 1989, after graduating from the National War College, Colonel Close was assigned to the 6th Infantry Division as an infantry (airborne) brigade commander. Two years later, Close became a division chief with JROC (J7 Joint Requirements Oversight Council). In 1993, as a brigadier general, Close was commissioned to the Office of the Secretary of the Army as senior military assistant.

In 1994, Assistant Division Commander Close provided operational and command leadership to the Army's 10th Mountain Division and served as the deputy joint-task-force commander. He coordinated a 22,000-man joint tasks force to Haiti and integrated the operations of 13 countries and 7 US agencies, which set the conditions for the restoration of democracy in Operation Uphold Democracy.

In 1995, Close served as director of operations (United States Southern Command, US Army) and led the training and operations direction of all US military air, land and sea forces stationed in Latin and South America and the Caribbean. He was simultaneously the Director Joint Interagency Task Force South, responsible for the coordination of US drug interdiction efforts throughout the region.

In 1997, promoted to major general, director for operational plans and interoperability, Close was responsible for the integration of all deliberate military war plans, the joint training, doctrine and education of the Armed Services, and the joint lessons-learned system.

From 1997 to 2000, Close served as the executive in charge of Joint Vision 2020 which called for overseeing military preparedness for future global responsibilities. Close established the U.S. Military's Joint Training System through application of technology which has dramatically improved US joint war fighting.

References 

Year of birth missing (living people)
Living people
Pepperdine University alumni
National War College alumni
United States Army generals
American chief executives
Military personnel from Dedham, Massachusetts
Dedham High School alumni